Marshfield is a city in Missouri and the county seat of Webster County, Missouri.  As of the 2010 census, the city population was 6,633. As of the 2020 census, Marshfield had a population of 7,458. It is part of the Springfield, Missouri, metropolitan area.

History 
Marshfield was platted in 1855, taking its name from Marshfield, Massachusetts. A post office called Marshfield has been in operation since 1856. The county seat was donated by William T. Burford. 

The Hosmer Dairy Farm Historic District and Rainey Funeral Home Building are listed on the National Register of Historic Places.

Marshfield is home to the only intersection of the TransAmerica Bicycle Trail and U.S. Route 66.

Geography
Marshfield is located at  (37.339599, -92.907230).

Climate
Marshfield has a humid subtropical climate (Köppen climate classification Cfa), with elements of a humid continental climate. The city experiences four distinct seasons; summers are warm and humid, while winters are cool with occasional cold spells. Rainfall is highest in the late spring. Snowfall is generally light, with an average of 5.2 inches (13 cm).

Demographics

2010 census
At the 2010 census, 6,633 people, 2,605 households, and 1,756 families were living in the city. The racial makeup of the city was 96.5% White, 0.4% African American, 0.8% Native American, 0.2% Asian, 0.5% from other races, and 1.7% from two or more races. Hispanics or Latinos of any race were 1.7%.

Of the 2,605 households, 37.0% had children under 18 living with them, 49.0% were married couples living together, 14.0% had a female householder with no husband present, 4.4% had a male householder with no wife present, and 32.6% were not families. About 28.9% of households were one person, and 14.8% were one person 65 or older. The average household size was 2.47, and the average family size was 3.04.

The median age was 36.4 years.  The city's age distribution was 27.6% under 18, 8.5% between 18 and 24; 24.3% from 25 to 44; 21.9% from 45 to 64; and 17.7% 65 or older. The gender makeup of the city was 47.1% male and 52.9% female.

2000 census
At the 2000 census, 5,720 people, 2,256 households, and 1,534 families resided in the city. The population density was 1,182.7 people per square mile (456.3/km). The 2,417 housing units had an average density of 499.8/sq mi (192.8/km).  The racial makeup of the city was 97.80% White, 0.19% African American, 0.42% Native American, 0.30% Asian, 0.12% from other races, and 1.17% from two or more races. Hispanics or Latinos of any race were 1.75%.

Of the 2,256 households. 34.7% had children under 18 living with them, 53.2% were married couples living together, 11.4% had a female householder with no husband present, and 32.0% were not families. About 28.7% of households were one person, and 16.0% were one person 65 or older. The average household size was 2.44, and the average family size was 3.00.

The age distribution was 27.1% under 18, 9.4% from 18 to 24, 27.2% from 25 to 44, 18.2% from 45 to 64, and 18.1% 65 or older. The median age was 35 years. For every 100 females, there were 85.0 males. For every 100 females age 18 and over, there were 79.3 males.

As of 2000, The median household income was $27,753, and the median family income was $36,090. Males had a median income of $27,813 versus $20,752 for females. The per capita income for the city was $14,855. About 5.5% of families and 11.6% of the population were below the poverty line, including 10.2% of those under age 18 and 12.2% of those age 65 or over.

Education 
Marshfield has one public high school, Marshfield High School. Marshfield Christian School is a private institution.

Marshfield has a lending library, which is a branch of the Webster County Library.

Government
As of June 2021, the mayor of Marshfield is Natalie B. McNish and the city administrator is Sam Rost.

Notable people

 Dan Clemens, Republican member of the Missouri State Senate, was reared in and lived in Marshfield.
 Joe Haymes, Swing Era orchestra leader, was born in Marshfield in 1907.
 Edwin Hubble, American astronomer - part of Interstate 44 through Marshfield is named the Edwin Hubble Highway.
 Darren King, member of the band Mutemath, was reared in Marshfield.

References

External links

 City of Marshfield
 Marshfield Mail newspaper
 A Directory of Towns, Villages, and Hamlets, Past and Present of Webster County, Missouri
 Historic maps of Marshfield in the Sanborn Maps of Missouri Collection at the University of Missouri
 Marshfield, MO Tornado, Apr 1880 at GenDisasters.com

Populated places established in 1830
Cities in Webster County, Missouri
County seats in Missouri
Springfield metropolitan area, Missouri
Cities in Missouri
1830 establishments in Missouri